Aled Gravelle is a Welsh rugby union player. He started his career playing at flanker before converting to Hooker. He played for Llanelli RFC before moving up to play for Scarlets, making 67 appearances before being released in 2007.

References

Welsh rugby union players
Scarlets players
Year of birth missing (living people)
Living people
Rugby union hookers